Eugene Stone III Soccer Stadium is a soccer-specific stadium in Greenville, South Carolina on the campus of Furman University.

The 3,000-seat (expandable) stadium opening in 1995 during a ceremony featuring Brazil national football team
late legend Pelé. The stadium is named for the late South Carolina benefactor Eugene Stone who donated a large sum of money which helped build the stadium.

External links
 Information at Furman athletics

Furman Paladins
Sports venues in Greenville, South Carolina
Soccer venues in South Carolina
College soccer venues in the United States
Sports venues completed in 1995
1995 establishments in South Carolina
National Premier Soccer League stadiums